Peter Molloy (1921–1973) was an Irish professional footballer who played as a defender.

Career
Molloy played for Bohemians in the League of Ireland, winning the Inter City Cup in 1945. He also played briefly for Notts County, making one appearance in the Football League during the 1947–48 season.

Molloy died in 1973 in Athlone, Ireland.

References

1921 births
1973 deaths
Republic of Ireland association footballers
Republic of Ireland football managers
Notts County F.C. players
Bohemian F.C. players
English Football League players
League of Ireland players
Association football defenders